Eusebio Serna (born 13 June 1961) is a Spanish wrestler. He competed in the men's freestyle 74 kg at the 1988 Summer Olympics.

References

1961 births
Living people
Spanish male sport wrestlers
Olympic wrestlers of Spain
Wrestlers at the 1988 Summer Olympics
Place of birth missing (living people)